British Ice Skating (formerly the National Ice Skating Association) is the national governing body of ice skating within the United Kingdom. Formed in 1879, it is responsible for overseeing all disciplines of ice skating: figure skating (singles, pairs and ice dance); synchronised skating; and speed skating (including short track).

History 

On Saturday 1 February 1879 a number of prominent men of Cambridgeshire and Huntingdonshire met in the Guildhall, Cambridge, to set up the National Skating Association with the aim of regulating the sport of fen skating. A Cambridge journalist, James Drake Digby, had thought that the Fen speed skaters were worthy of national recognition and he was also concerned that betting was leading to malpractice. He thought that skating needed a national organisation to control it, like the Jockey Club. The founding committee included several landowners, a vicar, a fellow of Trinity College, a magistrate, two members of parliament, the mayor of Cambridge, the Lord Lieutenant of Cambridgeshire, the president of Cambridge University Skating Club, and Neville Goodman, a graduate of Peterhouse, Cambridge.

The newly formed National Skating Association held their first one-and-a-half-mile British professional championship at Thorney in December 1879. There was a field of 32, including former champions Turkey Smart and Tom Watkinson. Fish Smart beat Knocker Carter in the final.  His reward was a badge, a sash and a cash prize, given as an annual salary in instalments to encourage the champion to "keep himself temperate". The NSA also established an amateur championship, which was held for the first time at Welsh Harp, London, in January 1880, and won by Frederick Norman, a farmer’s son from Willingham. The professionals were labourers who skated for cash prizes; the amateurs were gentlemen who skated for trophies.

In 1892 the NSA aided in the foundation of the International Skating Union (ISU). The NSA hosted the first international ice skating competition in Britain in Birmingham in 1899 and has hosted all events in the UK since in various locations.

In 1894 the National Skating Association decided to move their headquarters from Cambridge to London, from where they concentrated on figure skaters and rinkmen. Their new base, the National Skating Palace, is now better known as the London Palladium.

Until 1990, when an independent society was formed, the NSA was also the UK's governing body of roller skating. As a consequence of the segmentation, the NSA became NISA (National Ice Skating Association), the headquarters of which are now based in Nottingham.

In November 2018, the National Ice Skating Association began rebranding as British Ice Skating.

Assessment 
Complying to the purpose of the organisation, the BIS levels are used by instructors to grade learners of ice skating in the UK. There are various levels of student grades, as well as instructor grades.

Skate UK
These levels are generally taught in group classes, and are assessed by the instructors of these classes. The levels are as follows:

 Level 1
 Sit down and stand up
 March forwards across the ice
 Forward two-foot glide
 Skate and dip (little man)
 Turn around on the spot
 Level 2
 Backwards marching across the ice
 Forward swizzles (lemons)
 Forward two-foot glide on a curve (left and right)
 Two-foot turn on the spot (forwards to backwards, back to forwards)
 Snowplough or T-stop
 Level 3
 Forward stroking (showing correct use of blade)
 Moving two-foot turn (forwards to backwards, back to forwards)
 Backwards swizzles (lemons)
 Back two-foot glide
 Forward one-foot glide (left and right)
 Level 4
 Forward outside edges on a circle (left and right)
 Forward inside edges on a circle (left and right )
 Basic forward slalom (basic outside/inside edges)
 Backwards stroking
 Forward continuous chasses around a circle (left and right)
 Level 5
 Backward outside edges on a circle (left and right)
 Backward inside edges on a circle (left and right)
 Backward continuous chasses around a circle (clockwise and counter-clockwise)
 Forward crossovers (clockwise and anti-clockwise)
 Forward outside three turns (left and right) from standstill
 Level 6
 Forward inside three turn (left and right) from standstill
 Backward outside edges step to forward outside edge on a circle
 Backward crossovers (clockwise and anti-clockwise)
 Backward two-foot slalom
 Two-foot spin (min 2 revs)
 Level 7
 Forward inside open mohawk (left and right)
 Backward crossovers to landing position glide
 Continuous forward outside edges along a straight line (as per Level 1 Field Moves)
 Continuous forward inside edges along a straight line (As per level 1 Field Moves)
 Basic forward cross rolls
 Level 8
 Continuous outside three turns around a circle (3 in a row); left and right
 Continuous inside three turns around a circle (3 in a row); left and right
 Step sequence: three turns, mohawk, cross rolls, twizzles, toe steps etc.
 Forward inside single twizzle (left and right) (hockey skaters forward drag; left and right)
 One foot spin (min 2 revs) (hockey skaters 2 foot spin; min 4 revs)

Skate UK Star Levels (formerly known as Passport)
These levels may be attempted once the Skate UK levels have been passed. Skate UK Star levels may be taken in any or all of singles skating (free), ice dance, speed skating or synchronised skating, although you must complete a level in a given discipline before moving onto the next level in that discipline. These levels as also assessed by the instructor, but will be expected to be of a higher standard than the same moves in the Skate UK system. The levels are as follows:

Singles Skating 
 Bronze
 Forwards and backwards crossovers in a figure of 8
 Forward outside spiral on a curve (left and right)
 Spin on one foot (min 4 revs) optional entry and exit
 Waltz jump from 4-5 back crossovers (held landing for count of 3)
 Bunny hop into drag
 Silver
 Single salchow
 Spin on one foot (min 4 revs) entry from backwards crossovers, stepping into a forward outside edge, with a landing position exit
 Backward spiral on a curve (left and right)
 Backwards crossovers around a circle into an extended landing position for the count of 3 (left and right)
 Teapot on either foot (forwards or backwards)
 Gold
 Backwards outside one-foot spin (min 1 rev)
 Single toe loop (with correct take-off - not a toe three jump)
 Spiral sequence: forward outside spiral, forward outside three turn, two backwards crossovers, back inside spiral (spirals held for 3 seconds) clockwise and counter-clockwise
 A simple step sequence: must have three turns, mohawks, chasses, crossrolls, toe steps; these can be done on any edge, forwards or backwards
 Combination of skating movements: to include turns, jumps and spins in a short routine; with or without music (max 1 minute and 30 seconds)

Ice Dance 
 Bronze
 Forward open chasses/crossed (closed) chasses continuously on a circle (min 3) left and right
 Left forward outside mohawk, cross in front onto left back inside and step forwards to right forward inside (3 times) left and right
 Forward progressive runs
 Two consecutive left forward outside 3 turns followed by a sustained outside edge with the free leg extended for a count of 3 (left and right)
 Forward spiral inside and outside edges (either foot)
 Silver
 Forward progressive runs in a figure of 8
 Backward open chasses (3 on each foot) in a serpentine sequence
 Backward progressive runs in a figure of 8
 A 7-step dance sequence as follows: right forward inside open mohawk, right back outside run, right back outside cross in front left back inside, step forwards to right forward inside edge and repeat twice
 Forward inside single twizzles, left and right (min 4 in a row)
 Gold
 Forward run, forward slip chasses (3 times) in a figure of 8
 Basic backwards crossrolls
 Solo Novice Foxtrot with music
 Forward inside double twizzles (left and right)
 A 9-step dance sequence as follows; left forward outside progressive run, left forward outside closed chasses, left forward outside progressive run, left forward outside open mohawk, step behind to a left back inside edge and repeat twice.

Synchronized Skating 
 Bronze
 Forward block (full length of the rink) in shoulder hold using alternating left and right chasses
 Forward line (full length of the rink) in shoulder hold using alternating left and right chasses and swings
 Forward circle (at least 2 revolutions in both directions) in hand hold, facing inward using continuous chasses.
 Forward pin wheel (at least 2 revolutions in both directions) in shoulder hold, using consecutive chasses. 2, 3 or 4 spokes may be performed, depending on the number of skaters.
 Silver
 Block in shoulder hold. Push Left, push right, left cross edge, right cross edge, LFO 3 turn, right back cross edge, left back cross edge
 Line in shoulder hold. Push Left, push right, left cross edge, right cross edge, LFO 3 turn, right back cross edge, left back cross edge
 Circle in elbow hold (tea pot hold), facing in and performed in both directions. At least 2 consecutive sequences of; forward chasse, forward cross, FO 3 turn, backward chasse, backward cross, step to forward inside edge to repeat
 Forward intersection using alternating forward chasses. At least 3 pass throughs. Drag position may be introduced for variety.
 Gold
 Forward line in shoulder hold turning to back line into elbow hold. Step may be a combination of chasses, progressive runs, and back cross overs. This movement to be performed using full length of the rink.
 Block introducing a change of axis. Commence in shoulder hold down long axis. Push Left, push right, left cross edge, right cross edge, LFO 3 turn, right back cross edge, left back cross edge. Change to elbow hold, backward right chasse, right cross, right chasse, right cross, step to right forward inside edge to repeat.
 Change of configuration wheel, from 2 spokes to 4 spokes. A combination of forward chasses and crossovers and a 3 turn to backward chasses and crossovers. At least one change of hold must be performed.
 Forward intersection with a one revolution turn at the point of intersection (e.g. an inside twizzles or Austrian 3 turn). At least 3 pass throughs to be performed.

Pairs Skating 
 Bronze
 Forward stroking side by side (min 4 pushes) focus and emphasis on unison.
 Forward stroking in hand to hand hold (min 4 pushes)
 Basic upright spin side by side (min 2 revs) any entry and exit
 Bunny hop side by side
 Forward spiral in a straight line side by side.
 Silver
 Forward stroking in Kilian Hold (min 4 pushes) focus and emphasis on timing and unison.
 Forwards cross overs around a circle in hand to hand hold (clockwise and counter-clockwise)
 Side by side Waltz jumps from 3 backward crossovers (emphasis on unison)
 Two-foot spiralling curve in Kilian hold.
 Forward spiral in a straight line in Kilian hold
 Gold
 Forwards crossovers in a figure of 8 in hand to hand hold.
 Backward crossovers around a circle in hand to hand hold (clockwise and counter-clockwise)
 Side by side Single Salchow from 3 backward crossovers
 Simple Pairs spin (min 2 revs) in Kilian hold, any entry and exit.
 Spirals: One skater forward spiral/ one skater backward spiral hand to hand hold

Judged Levels
These levels either go from 1 to 10 or correspond to competition categories (Basic Novice, Intermediate Novice, etc.) and are assessed by at least one BIS qualified judge. Skaters must show proof that they have completed the Skate UK Star programme before being allowed to apply for the judged levels. Tests are available in each of the following disciplines – skaters may take tests in whichever disciplines they wish. Skaters do not need to complete the tests in every discipline before moving up to the next level, but cannot skip levels in any given discipline (i.e. must do Level 1 Field Moves before doing Level 2 Field Moves, but Level 1 Elements is not required to do Level 2 field moves).
 Field Moves – assessing control of edges
 Elements – these are elements of free skating such as jumps, spins and step sequences which are done in isolation
 Free Skating – using the elements in a continuous routine or program of a given length, set to music. Music for free skating must not have vocals.
 Compulsory Dances – there are 2 dances at each level. Dances may be tested solo or with a partner, although if both partners are taking the test either two judges are required or the partners will need to repeat each dance so that one is being assessed on the first time and one the second.
 Variations (up to Level 2) – this is done as part of the pattern of one of the compulsory dances followed by a specific number of bars of a dance to the same music which is invented by the skater (more usually their coach) followed by the end of the compulsory pattern. 2 full repeats must be skated.
 Original Dance (Level 3 and above) – a full routine to a given type of music with no compulsory dance sequence at the beginning.
 Free Dance – similar to the Free Skating this is a program of a given length, to music (which may include vocals), including certain required dance elements.
In summer 2020, BIS introduced new Interim Test Levels for Field Moves and Singles (Elements and Free) tests. The current levels will still be available for applications until 31st December 2020, after which time only the interim levels will be available.

Field Moves

Until beginning of January 2021
 Level 1: Forward Outside edges down one side of the rink, between 4 and 8 semicircles required; Forward Inside edges, between 4 and 8 semicircles required; Forward Crossovers in both directions, done as a figure of 8; Backwards crossovers in both directions done as a figure of 8; backward crossovers into landing position in both directions; spirals in a straight line down one side of the rink, half the length on each foot, repeat on other side of rink.
 Level 2: Back Outside edges down one side of the rink, between 4 and 8 semicircles required; Back Inside edges, between 4 and 8 semicircles required; Forwards and backwards crossrolls; Mohawk sequence – push LFO, RFI mohawk to LBI, step wide R crossover, step to forward and repeat on other foot. Repeat down the rink; Outside 3 turns in figure of 8; Inside 3 turns in figure of 8.
 Level 3: Forward edge changes on 1 foot; Alternating 3 turns (LFO RBI for half the rink, RFO LBI for second half, then second side LFI RBO then RFI LBO), ; Forward stroking with extended positions; Spirals on curves (LFO toe push LFI push RFI toe push RFO then to other side of rink RFI RFO LFO LFI).
 Level 4: Outside back 3 turns; Mohawk step sequence; Back outside 3 turns – forward inside mohawks in a circle; Backward stroking with extended positions
 Level 5: Perimeter BO and BI double threes; Perimeter back changes of edge (BO/BI and BI/BO); One foot slaloms (forwards and backwards on each foot – half a side of rink on each foot – one side forwards one side backwards); Alternating choctaws (BO 3, FI choctaw, cross cut, cross roll BO three, then repeat)
 Level 6: Perimeter FI and FO double threes; FI rockers and BI double rockers; FO and FI brackets; Russian stroking (clockwise and anti-clockwise) (NB they look for quick changes and steep lobes for this exercise at this level)
 Level 7: BO change of edge to BI double threes, BI change of edge to BO double threes; BI rocker/choctaw on a circle; BO and BI quick three turns (intro to twizzles) – basically a double twizzle or double double three; BI brackets (FI 3 cross in front, BI bracket)
 Level 8: (skater selects 4 out of 6) Perimeter Skating – Forward Counters, Perimeter Skating – Backward Counters, Barrel Roll and Toe Steps, Perimeter Skating – Quick 3 turns and Choctaws, Kilian Choctaws, Counter Twizzles and Back Outside Twizzles
 Level 9: (skater selects 4 out of 6) Fast circular Mohawks and Slip Step, Perimeter Skating – Forward Rockers, Perimeter Skating – 1-foot power rockers, inside double threes and twizzle, backward outside twizzles, closed choctaws
 Level 10: (skater selects 4 out of 6) Perimeter Skating – Backward Rockers, Perimeter backward loops and quick bracket three turn, Ina Bauer exercise, quick hip twists, double twizzles (both feet, both edges), swing rockers

Interim Field Moves 2020
 Level 1: Basic Forward Continuous Edges; Backward Outside Edge in Sustained Position; Forward and Backward Crosscuts in Figure of Eight Pattern; Basic Backward Continuous Edges
 Level 2: Perimeter Skating – Cross Rolls; Forward Outside and Forward Inside Three Turn Exercises; Forward Outside and Forward Inside Three Turn Exercise; Forward Inside Open Mohawk Exercises; Forward Perimeter Change of Edges
 Level 3: Perimeter Skating – Forward Three Turns; Forward Outside Closed Mohawk Sequence; Backward Three Turn/Forward Mohawk Step; Perimeter Skating – Spirals on Curves
 Basic Novice: Backward Perimeter Change of Edges; Forwards and Backwards One Foot Slalom; Perimeter Skating – Backward Double Threes;  Progressive Serpentine Forward Double Three Turns Exercise
 Intermediate Novice: Perimeter Skating – Inside Rockers; Perimeter Skating – Forward Brackets; Backward Rocker & Choctaw; Back Inside Brackets
 Advanced Novice: Perimeter Skating – Forward Counters; Perimeter Skating – Backward Counters;  Barrel Roll and Toe Steps; Perimeter Skating – Quick Three Turns & Choctaws; Kilian Choctaws; Counter Twizzles & Backward Outside Twizzles
 Junior: Fast Circular Mohawks and Slip Step; Perimeter Skating – Forward Rockers; Perimeter Skating – One Foot Power Rockers; Inside Double Threes and Twizzles; Backward Outside Twizzles; Closed Choctaws
 Senior: Perimeter Skating – Backward Rockers; Perimeter Backward Loops and Quick Bracket Three Turn; Ina Bauer Exercise; Quick Hip Twists; Double Twizzles; Swing Rockers

Elements

Until beginning of January 2021
 Level 1: Perimeter skating; Toe Loop; Three jump or salchow; Upright spin 3 revs; Step sequence; Forward spiral; Backward spiral on a curve
 Level 2: Perimeter skating; 3 jump; salchow or toe loop;  upright spin (5 revs); sit spin (3 revs); backspin from a 3 turn entry (1–2 revs); step sequence
 Level 3: Figure 8 crossovers; loop; flip; combination jump with a toe loop as the second jump; camel spin (3 revs); backspin (3 revs); step sequence – with forward and backward 3 turns
 Level 4: lutz; axel; jump combination with loop as the second jump; camel-sit spin combination (2 revs in each position); change foot upright spin (4 revs on each foot); circular step sequence with mohawks and 3 turns; a sequence with at least 2 of these in: Spread eagle, Ina bauer, spiral, drag, pivot
 Level 5: Perimeter power crossover stroking; Axel with flow; Double Salchow; Jump combination, one of which must be a Lutz or Flip; Flying Camel spin (2–3 revolutions); Sit-Change Sit spin (minimum of 4 revolutions on each foot); Spin with one change of position and one change of foot (minimum of 3 revolutions on each foot)
 Level 6: Double Toe Loop; Jump combination consisting of Axel, Double Toe Loop; Jump sequence consisting of 2 single jumps; Camel-Change Camel spin (minimum 3 revolutions on each foot); Layback spin (minimum 5 revolutions) or Crossfoot spin (min 4 revolutions); Incorporate 3 of the following into a simple figure of eight pattern sequence –  forward spiral, backward spiral, pivot, Ina Bauer, spreadeagle, drag; Serpentine step sequence (half the size of the rink)
 Level 7: Double salchow, double toe, jump combination double+single, flying camel to back sit spin (4 revs per position), spin combo with one change of foot and one of position (5 revs per foot), jump sequence of 3 jumps including 1 double, straight line step sequence using full ice
 Level 8: Double loop, axel with speed and flow, jump combinations with double toe as second jump, jump sequence to include at least 2 double jumps, flying camel spin (6 revs), sit-sit or camel-camel (6 revs per foot), serpentine step sequence
 Level 9: Double flip, jump combination 2 doubles NOT including double loop, jump combination 2 doubles with double loop as second, flying sit spin (5 revs), spin combo with 1 change of foot and 2 changes of position (6 revs per foot), layback or sideways spin (8 revs) or 2 foot cross foot spin (6 revs), sequence of spirals using full ice. 
 Level 10: Double lutz, jump combo of 2 doubles (one must be double flip or double lutz), jump sequence to involve 2 double jumps, death drop or flying change sit spin (6 revs), spin combo with one change of foot and 2 changes of position showing 3 different positions (6 revs per foot), spiral step sequence using full ice, free choice step sequence using full ice.

Interim Elements 2020
 Level 1:
 3 x Single jumps, excluding axel 
 1 x Combination jump, consisting of 2 x Single jumps 
 Upright spin (Upright position only) with a change of foot and a minimum of 6 revolutions or without a change of foot and a minimum of 4 revolutions.
 Sit Spin or Camel Spin with no change of foot and 4 revs in total with minimum 2 in position 
 1 x Forward and 1 x Backward Spiral on a curve held for a minimum of 10 metres 
 1 x Choreographic sequence.
 Level 2:
 Simple forward perimeter stroking in both directions. To be skated clockwise and anti-clockwise using a maximum of four to six strokes along the long sides. 
 3 x single jumps, one of which must be Flip, Lutz or axel 
 1 x Combination jump consisting of 2 x Single jumps. 
 1 x Combination Spin with only 1 change of position and no change of foot and 6 revs with minimum 2 revs in each basic position 
 1 x Spin with no change of position, excluding upright. 
 1 x Simple step sequence with full ice coverage
 Level 3:
 1 x Single Lutz 
 1 x Single Axel 
 1 x Jump combination of 2 x single jumps 
 EITHER 1 x Jump sequence consisting of 1 x Single jump and 1 x Single Axel or 1 x Combination jump consisting of 1 x axel and 1 x single jump. 
 1 x Back entry Upright spin either with change of foot (min 6 revs) or without a change of foot (min 4 revs) 
 1 x Combination spin with at least 1 change of basic position and 1 change of foot, and minimum 6 revs in total with each basic position a minimum of 2 revs in position 
 1 x Step sequence utilising the full ice surface and including at least 3 one-footed turns of 2 different types.
 Basic Novice: 
 1 x Single Axel 
 1 x Double jump 
 1 x Jump combination of 2 jumps consisting of EITHER 2 x Single jumps OR 1 x Double jump and 1 x Single jump 
 1 x Jump sequence consisting of 2 jumps maintaining rhythm and flow throughout consisting of EITHER 1 x Single jump + 1 x Single Axel OR 1 x Double jump + 1 x Single Axel 
 1 x Combination Spin with only 1 change of position and no change of foot and 6 revs with minimum 2 revs in each basic position 
 A Basic Position spin, either Camel or Sit, with (only) one change of foot. (Minimum 3 revs in total and 2 revs in basic position on each foot) 
 A step sequence utilising the full surface of the ice including at least 4 one-footed turns of minimum 2 different types with nothing repeated more than twice.
 Intermediate Novice:
 1 x Double Jump 
 1 x Double jump different from No. 1 
 1 Jump combination consisting of 2 x Double jumps 
 EITHER 1 x Jump sequence consisting of 1 x Double jump and 1 x Single Axel or 1 x Combination jump consisting of 1 x Single Axel and 1 x Double jump. 
 1 x Basic Position spin from Camel or Sit with a change of foot and minimum 3 rev. on each foot or without a change of foot and minimum 6 revs in total. 
 1 x Combination Spin either with a change of foot and minimum 8 revs or without a change of foot and minimum 6 revs. 
 1 x Step sequence utilising the full ice surface including at least 5 one-footed turns with nothing repeated more than twice.
 Advanced Novice:
 A double Flip or Lutz or Double Axel 
 3 different solo Double jumps different from that chosen in No. 1. 
 A jump combination consisting of two double jumps 
 1 x jump sequence consisting of 1 x Double jump and 1 x Axel (single or double) 
 A Combination Spin with a change of foot showing all 3 basic positions, with 8 revs in total and minimum 2 revs in each basic position. 
 A Flying Camel spin (minimum 6 revs) 
 One step sequence utilising the full ice surface including at least 5 one-footed turns with nothing repeated more than twice.
 Junior:
 A double Axel 
 2 x different double jumps or triple jumps, not including axel. 
 A jump combination consisting of two double jumps, one of which must be an edge take off. 
 A jump combination consisting of two double jumps, one of which must be a toe take off. Must not be identical to No. 3 5. A flying sit spin or death drop with a minimum of 6 revs. 
 A spin combination showing all 3 basic positions. Must have a change of foot and a minimum of 10 rev. in total. Flying entrance is not permitted. 
 A Choreographic Sequence utilising the ice surface. As per ISU single free skating programme requirements. 
 A Step Sequence fully utilising the Ice Surface. Must include at least 7 one-foot turns none of which can be counted more than twice.
 Senior:
 A double Axel with speed and flow 
 A Triple jump 
 A Jump combination consisting of one double and one triple. (Triple jump may be a repeat of 2). One of the jumps must be a toe take off. 
 A jump combination consisting of either 2 x double jumps or 1 x triple jump and 1 x double jump. One of the jumps must be an edge take off. 
 A Flying (free choice) spin with a minimum of 8 revs in total. 
 A spin combination showing all 3 basic positions. Must have a change of foot and a minimum of 10 rev. in total. Flying entrance is not permitted. 
 A Choreographic Sequence fully utilising the ice surface as per ISU single free skating programme requirements. 
 A Step Sequence fully utilising the Ice Surface. Must include at least 7 one foot turns, none of which can be counted more than twice.

Free programme

Until beginning of January 2021
 Level 1: 1 min 30 second programme to include 2 different jumps, 1 spin, spiral (forward or backward), step sequence (10 metres)
 Level 2: 1 min 30 second programme with 2 different jumps, a combination, 2 different spins, a step sequence (2/3 length of rink)
 Level 3: 1 min 30 seconds with 2 different jumps one of which must be a flip, one jump combination, 2 different spins (from camel, sit, upright), step sequence (full length of rink)
 Level 4: 2 mins with 2 different jumps one of which must be an axel, a jump combination with a flip or a lutz, 1 spin combination (which must include one change of position – 2 revs per position), 1 additional spin (min 4 revs), circular step sequence and a moves (i.e. spirals bauers) sequence
 Level 5: 2 mins including axel with flow, 2 different jumps including one double, one jump combo including a flip/lutz, at least 2 different spins one with change of foot and one with change of position (3 revs per foot/position), and a spiral or Moves in the Field sequence (covering half the ice surface).
 Level 6: 2 min 30 seconds, as for L5 but both jumps must be doubles and spiral sequence must use full ice.
 Level 7: 3 mins including axel with flow, 2 different double jumps, one jump combo including a double, jump sequence including one double, at least 2 different spins including a spin combo and a flying spin (4 revs per foot/position), spiral sequence covering full ice.
 Level 8: 3 mins (ladies) 3 mins 30 (men) including axel with speed and flow, 3 different double jumps, one jump combo including 2 doubles,  at least 3 different spins including a spin combo and a flying spin (4 revs per foot/position), step sequence covering full ice.
 Level 9: 3 mins 30 (ladies) 4 mins (men) including 4 different double jumps, one jump combo including 2 doubles, one flying spin (5 revs), 2 different spins including a spin combo (6 revs per foot), spiral sequence covering full ice.
 Level 10: 4 mins (ladies) 4 mins 30 (men) including 5 different double jumps, one jump combo including 2 doubles, one flying spin (5 revs), 2 different spins including a spin combo (6 revs per foot), spiral sequence covering full ice, step sequence covering full ice

Interim Free 2020
 Level 1: 1 minute 30 second programme consisting of 4 jump elements (singles, 1 x jump combination), a maximum of 2 spins of a different nature (one spin combination and one spin with no change of position), a maximum of 1 x choreographic sequence
 Level 2: 1 minute 30 second OR 2 minute programme consisting of 4 jump elements (singles, minimum 1 and maximum 2 x jump combinations), 2 spins of a different nature - one spin combination and one spin with no change of position (both spins: min 6 revolutions with a change of foot OR min 4 revolutions without change of foot), 1 simple step sequence
 Level 3: 2 minute programme consisting of max. 4 jump elements (singles or doubles,  minimum 1 and maximum 2 x jump combinations), 2 spins of a different nature - one spin combination and one spin with no change of position (both spins: min 6 revolutions with a change of foot OR min 4 revolutions without change of foot), 1 step sequence with at least 3 one foot turns of 2 different types
 Basic Novice: 2 minute OR 2 minute 30 seconds programme consisting of max. 4 jump elements (minimum 1 axel, minimum 1 and maximum 2 x jump combinations), 2 spins of a different nature - one spin combination and one spin with no change of position (both spins: min 6 revolutions with a change of foot OR min 4 revolutions without change of foot, flying entries permitted), 1 step sequence with at least 4 one foot turns of 2 different types
 Intermediate Novice: 2 minute 30 seconds OR 3 minute programme consisting of max. 5 jump elements (minimum 1 axel, 2 different solo double jumps, 1 jump combination of 2 jumps - either 1 x double and 1 x single or 2 x double), 2 spins of a different nature - one spin combination and one spin with no change of position (both spins: min 8 revolutions with a change of foot OR min 6 revolutions without change of foot, flying entries permitted), 1 step sequence with at least 5 one foot turns of 2 different types
 Advanced Novice: 3 minute programme consisting of 6 jump elements (1 axel, 3 different solo double jumps, 1 jump combination of 2 double jumps), 2 spins of a different nature - one spin combination and one spin with no change of position (both spins: min 8 revolutions with a change of foot OR min 6 revolutions without change of foot, flying entries permitted), 1 step sequence with at least 5 one foot turns
 Junior: 3 minute or 3 minute 30 seconds programme consisting of 7 jump elements (1 double axel, 4 solo double or triple jumps, 2 jump combinations of 2 double jumps), 3 spins of a different nature - one spin combination, one flying spin and one spin with no change of position (spin combination min 10 revolutions, flying spin min 6 revolutions or 10 with flying entrance, basic position spin min 6 revolutions), 1 step sequence with at least 7 one foot turns
 Senior: 4 minute programme consisting of 7 jump elements (1 double axel, 1 triple jump, 3 solo double jumps, 2 jump combinations of 2 double jumps), 3 spins of a different nature - one spin combination, one flying spin and one spin with no change of position (spin combination min 10 revolutions, flying spin min 6 revolutions or 10 with flying entrance, basic position spin min 6 revolutions), 1 step sequence with at least 7 one foot turns, 1 choreographic sequence

Compulsory Dance
It is not always clear which of the official tunes are needed for each dance, so these are shown in brackets where different from the dance name. Coaches will have copies of the official tunes which must be used for tests. Step patterns for many of the dances may be found Ice-Dance.com.

 Level 1: Novice Foxtrot (Foxtrot), Rhythm Blues (Blues)
 Level 2: Canasta Tango (Tango), Dutch Waltz (Waltz)
 Level 3: Golden Skaters Waltz (Westminster Waltz), Riverside Rhumba
 Level 4: Fiesta Tango (Tango), Swing Dance (Rocker Foxtrot)
 Level 5: 14 Step, Willow Waltz (Waltz)
 Level 6: European Waltz (Waltz), Foxtrot
 Level 7: American Waltz, 22 Step
 Level 8A: Rocker Foxtrot, Blues
 Level 8B: Tango, Silver Samba (Samba)
 Level 9A: Kilian, Starlight Waltz
 Level 9B: Paso Doble, Argentine Tango
 Level 10A: Viennese Waltz, Quickstep
 Level 10B: Westminster Waltz, Rhumba
 Level Gold Bar 1: Austrian Waltz, Cha Cha Congelado (must be skated as a couple)
 Level Gold Bar 2: Ravensburger Waltz, Yankee Polka (must be skated as a couple)
 Level Gold Star: Golden Waltz, Tango Romantica, Midnight Blues (must be skated as a couple)

Variations
 Level 1: Rhythm Blues
 Level 2: Canasta Tango

Original Dance
 Level 3: 1 min 30 including a midline or diagonal step sequence. Couples may have one lift
 Level 4: as for L3 plus 1 twizzle (1 rotation minimum). 
 Level 5: as for L4, plus twizzles in both directions (1 rotation minimum), up to 2 spins now allowed.
 Level 6: as for L5, twizzles must be one set of twizzles (1 rotation minimum clockwise and anticlockwise) up to one step between
 Level 7: 2 min including a midline or circular or diagonal step sequence, one set of twizzles (2 rotation minimum clockwise and anticlockwise) up to one step between, one but no more than 2 spins (3 revs). Couples may have one lift
 Level 8: as for L7
 Level 9: 2 mins 30 requirements as for L8
 Level 10: as for L9 (2 lifts allowed)
 Level Gold Bar 1: 2 min 30 program of senior championship standard
 Level Gold Bar 2: 2 min 30 program of senior championship standard
 Level Gold Star: 2 min 30 program of senior championship standard

FreeDance
 Level 1: 1 min 30 including a midline or diagonal step sequence. Couples may have one lift
 Level 2: as for L1
 Level 3: as for L2, step sequence must be full length plus spin (3 revs), one twizzle (1 rotation). 
 Level 4: as for L3 may have 2 spins, plus twizzle (1 clockwise, 1 anticlockwise, 1 rotation minimum). 
 Level 5: as for L4
 Level 6: as for L5, twizzles must be one set of twizzles clockwise and anticlockwise (2 rotation on each foot) up to three steps between.
 Level 7: 2 min as for L6 
 Level 8: 2 min as for L7 couples may have 2 lifts, Step seq can also be serpentine. 
 Level 9: 3 mins as for L8
 Level 10:3 mins as for L9
 Level Gold Bar 1: 4 min program of senior championship standard
 Level Gold Bar 2: 4 min program of senior championship standard
 Level Gold Star: 4 min program of senior championship standard

Events 
A calendar of events that British Ice Skating will host and organise can be found here.

References

External links
 BIS Official Website

National governing bodies for ice skating
Sports organizations established in 1879
Nottingham
Organisations based in Nottinghamshire
Sports governing bodies in the United Kingdom
1879 establishments in the United Kingdom
Ice skating governing bodies
Ice skating in the United Kingdom